Indonesia–Syria relations was officially established in 1949, and it was among earliest international recognitions on Indonesian sovereignty. Both nations have common perceptions related to Palestine, Iraq and Lebanon issues, and Indonesia always supports Syria in international forum on the issue of the Golan Heights. Regarding the current events of the Syrian Civil War, Indonesia has urged all parties in Syria to end the violence, while pledging to provide US$500,000 worth of humanitarian assistance to conflict-torn Syria in 2014. Previously Indonesia has donated the same amount to Syria in 2012 and 2013 under United Nations. Indonesia has an embassy in Damascus, while Syria has an embassy in Jakarta. Both nations are the member of Non-Aligned Movement and Organisation of Islamic Cooperation.

History
During Indonesian National Revolution, Syria was among the earliest nations that support and the Indonesian struggle for independence. In 1947, Permanent Representative of Syria to the United Nations, Fares al-Khoury, had pushed the "Indonesian question" agenda to be discussed in United Nations Security Council. Official diplomatic relations were established in 1949 after the recognition of Indonesia by the UN General Assembly.

High level visits
Indonesian President Suharto visited Syria in October 1977. Syrian Prime Ministers Mahmoud Zuabi visited Indonesia, and Muhammad Naji al-Otari in June 1997 and in January 2009 respectively.

Economy and trade
The bilateral trade reached US$47.08 million in 2003 and grew to US$100 million in 2008. The balance of trade is weighed heavily in the favor of Indonesia whose exports include textiles, rubber, tea, coffee, palm oil, wood and paper.

Notes

External links
Embassy of Indonesia in Damascus, Syria
Embassy of Syria in Jakarta, Indonesia

 
Syria
Bilateral relations of Syria